Fender Katsalidis (FK) is an architecture firm which originated in Melbourne, Victoria, Australia, and now has additional studios in Sydney and Brisbane. Founded by Karl Fender and Nonda Katsalidis, the firm has been notable since the early 1990s, producing many landmark buildings in Melbourne and other Australian cities. The firm was first established as Nation Fender and, since 1996, as Nation Fender Katsalidis.

FK buildings are distinctive, often very sculptural, they also feature a variety of materials and textures such as exposed steel, left to the weather, or rough hewn timber. Australian Institute of Architects Gold Medallist Peter Wilson has described this material palette as reminiscent of "ageing boat hulls or rough woodsheds and agricultural structures built by first settlers in the Australian landscape." An early FK project involved the conversion of former grain silos in Richmond, a Melbourne suburb, into distinctive apartments featuring balconies resembling a ship's bow. FK also designed Eureka Tower completed in June 2006 in Southbank, which has become Melbourne's tallest building and one of the tallest residential buildings in the world.

Notable projects 
Argus Centre (1991), Melbourne
Melbourne Terrace Apartments (1994), Melbourne
The Malthouse (Richmond Silos) (1997), Richmond
Ian Potter Museum of Art (1998), Carlton
Republic Tower (1999), Melbourne
Sidney Myer Asia Centre Parkville
HM@S Lonsdale (2003), Port Melbourne
Royal Parade Luxury Apartments (2005), Melbourne
Eureka Tower (2007), Melbourne
NewActon East (2008), Canberra
Sienna Apartments (2010), Melbourne
Museum of Old and New Art (2011), Hobart
Australia 108 (2020), Melbourne
Merdeka 118, Kuala Lumpur, Malaysia

Awards 
 RAIA Harry Seidler Award for Commercial Architecture (2007) for the Eureka Tower, Melbourne
 AIA Award for Commercial Architecture (2008), for the NewActon East, Canberra
 2012 Australian Institute of Architects Sir Zelman Cowen Award for Public Architecture

References

External links 

Architecture firms of Australia
Architecture firms based in Victoria (Australia)
Design companies established in 1996